The name Ava has been used for five tropical cyclones in the Eastern Pacific Ocean.
 Tropical Storm Ava (1962), formed well clear of the Mexican coastline
 Tropical Storm Ava (1965), stayed well out to sea
 Tropical Storm Ava (1969), moved parallel to the southwest Mexican coast, but did not make landfall
 Hurricane Ava (1973), did not approach land
 Tropical Storm Ava (1977), stayed clear of land

The name Ava has also been used for one tropical cyclone in the Southwest Indian Ocean.
 Cyclone Ava (2018)

Pacific hurricane set index articles
South-West Indian Ocean cyclone set index articles